Zarqa Governorate ( Muħāfazat az-Zarqāʔ, local dialects ez-Zergā or ez-Zer'a) is the third largest governorate in Jordan by population. The capital of Zarqa governorate is Zarqa City, which is the largest city in the governorate. The second largest city in the governorate is Russeifa.

Zarqa Governorate hosts the largest military and air bases of the Jordanian armed forces.

History

The land of Zarqa Governorate has been inhabited since the Bronze Age, most prominent were the Ammonite kingdom and the Nabateans, who constructed the fort known as Qasr al Hallabat, which then was used as a fort by the Romans, and then as a desert palace by the Umayyads.

The most significant historical remains are the Umayyad desert palaces, such as Qasr Amra, a World Heritage site, Qasr al Hallabat, Qasr Shabib in the center of the city of Zarqa, as well as the Castle of Azraq.

After the construction of the Hedjaz railway by the Ottoman Turks at the beginning of the 1900s, Zarqa became a strategically important hub that connects Damascus to Medina, the cities along the railway started flourishing. Later, Jordan's Arab Legion led by Glubb Pasha had its main bases in Zarqa.

Geography

Zarqa Governorate borders Mafraq Governorate from the north and north east, Amman Governorate from the south and south west, Jerash and Balqa Governorates from the west. It also shares an international border with Saudi Arabia in its south eastern edge.

Most of the area covered by the governorate constitutes part of the Syrian desert plateau. the heavily populated western regions of the governorate constitute part of the Zarqa River basin. The two cities of Zarqa and Russeifa are the second and fourth largest cities in Jordan.

Demographics
The census of 2004 shows that the population of Zarqa Governorate for that year was 764,650 of whom 94.5% is considered urban population and 5.5% is a rural population. Jordanian citizens made up 97% of the population. The female to male ratio was 46% to 54%. The Jordanian Department of Statistics population estimate for the year 2010 is 910,800 with a female to male ratio of 48.25 to 51.75 and a population density of 191.3 persons per Km2  

The population of districts according to census results:

Administrative divisions 
Zarqa Governorate is divided into three departments:

Economy

Due to its close location to the populated cities in Jordan, Zarqa Governorate has the largest number of factories in Jordan, Jordan's only oil refinery plant is located in Zarqa.

Muwaffaq Salti Air Base, the largest in the country, is located in Azraq. Zarqa Governorate hosts three universities,
Hashemite University, Al-Balqa` Applied University-Zarqa College, and Zarqa Private University.

Gallery

References

External links

 
Governorates of Jordan